Claud William Wright CB (9 January 1917, Ellenborough, Yorkshire, England – 15 February 2010, Burford, Oxfordshire, England), aka Willy Wright, was a senior British civil servant who was also an expert in the disciplines of geology, palaeontology, and archaeology.

Life 
He was educated at Charterhouse and Christ Church, Oxford. At Oxford, he was influenced by the geologist W. J. Arkell, an interest that became a serious hobby. His professional career was in the War Office/Ministry of Defence, where he reached the rank of Deputy Secretary.

In 1971, he transferred to the Ministry of Education and there was involved with the establishment of the first Ministry of Arts. In these posts, he worked directly with Margaret Thatcher and Lord Eccles.

It was in Wright's hobbies where he made his greatest mark. Whilst working as a civil servant he was, between 1956–58, President of the Geologists' Association, but after he "retired" in 1976 he could devote his time to his interests. From 1977 to 1983, he was a Research Fellow at Wolfson College, Oxford.

He was married to Alison Readman (1922-2003) with four daughters and a son.

Honours 
For his work with the Civil Service work he was awarded the CB (1969). He won many prizes, medals, and a Fellowships as an Hon. Associate of the British Museum) for his hobby work. Fifteen genera or species of fossil bear his name:   ammonites, starfish, a brachiopod, a snail, and a crab.

Publications 
He published many articles on such diverse topics as ammonites, starfish, invertebrates, Cretaceous crabs, and the Bridlington Giant Flying Lizard.

Collection
Wright's collection was split between the Natural History Museum (25,500 pieces in all) and the Wright Library in the Oxford University Museum.

Ferriby boats 
While walking with his brother beside the River Humber on holiday, Wright found three Bronze Age Ferriby Boats, one of which is now in the National Maritime Museum.

References

Sources 

 
 
 "WRIGHT, Claud William", Who's Who 2010, A & C Black, 2010; online edition, Oxford University Press, December 2010; online edition, March 2010. Accessed 1 September 2010.
 

 
 

1917 births
2010 deaths
People from the East Riding of Yorkshire
People educated at Charterhouse School
Alumni of Christ Church, Oxford
English geologists
British palaeontologists
English civil servants
Companions of the Order of the Bath
Fellows of Wolfson College, Oxford
People associated with the British Museum
People associated with the Natural History Museum, London
Scientists from Yorkshire
Presidents of the Geologists' Association